Stay Awake: Various Interpretations of Music from Vintage Disney Films is a 1988 tribute album recorded by various artists performing songs from Disney films. It was produced by Hal Willner, one of the many tribute albums he has done.

The NME ranked it at number 37 in their list of the best albums of 1988. The album cover features artwork by Rodney Greenblat.

Track listing

Personnel

References

Covers albums
Children's music albums
Albums produced by Hal Willner
1988 compilation albums
A&M Records compilation albums
Pop rock compilation albums
Disney albums
Tribute albums